Lguest is a Linux kernel x86 virtualization hypervisor introduced in kernel version 2.6.23 (released 9 October 2007) and removed in kernel version 4.14 (November 2017). The hypervisor is an operating-system-level virtualization system capable of running unmodified 32-bit x86 Linux kernels as guest machines. Installation is as easy as running modprobe lg followed by tools/lguest/lguest to create a new guest.

Lguest can still be installed on kernel 4.14 and later through out-of-tree patches.

Lguest was maintained by Rusty Russell.

See also

 Comparison of platform virtualization software
 Kernel-based Virtual Machine

References

External links
 
 An introduction to lguest (LWN.net)

Linux kernel features
Free virtualization software
Virtualization software for Linux